Ekaterina Sergeevna Selezneva (Yekaterina Sergeyevna Seleznyova; born May 18, 1995 in Pushkino, Pushkinsky District, Moscow Oblast) is a Russian individual rhythmic gymnast. She is the hoop world champion in the Rhythmic Gymnastics World Championships 2019. She is also the 2018 Grand Prix Final All-around champion and the 2019 Summer Universiade All-Around gold medalist. On the national level, she is the 2018 Russian National all around bronze medalist.

Personal life
Selezneva is engaged to Russian TV Host Organizer and Sports journalist Sergey Gladun. The couple married August 18, 2021. She has appeared in editorial pages for Vogue Russia.

Career 
Ekaterina Selezneva was born in the city of Pushkino, in Moscow region, Russia. She is trained by her mother, Olga Nikolaevna Nazarova. She is a Master of Sports of International Class in Russia. A veteran in Russian rhythmic years, Selezneva has competed as a senior since 2011 and was member of the Russian individuals reserve.

2013 season
In 2013, Selezneva got her breakthrough in Russia, she won the bronze medal in hoop apparatus in Russian Cup and in Russian Championships and was invited to be the member of the Russian National Team in January 2013. She graduated from No8 Pushkino secondary school with a gold medal the same year.

2014 season
In 2014, at the 2014 Russian Championships, Selezneva won gold in Clubs ahead of Arina Averina who took the silver medal respectively. The same year, she competed in the Italian Serie A club championship.

2015 season
In 2015, Selezneva had her highest placement finishing 4th in all-around at the 2015 Russian Championships, she won gold in the ribbon apparatus final. She then won the all around gold at the Holon International tournament. She again competed in the Italian Serie A club championship culminating the end of the season.

2016 season
In February 2016, she won the all around gold at the Alina Cup in Moscow with overall score of 71.516 points. She finished 6th in the all-around at the 2016 Russian Championships. She took sixth place overall in Baltic Hoop International Rhythmic Gymnastics Tournament in Riga, Latvia.

2017 season

In February 2017, Selezneva won the all around gold at Alina Cup in Moscow with overall score of 72.350 points. In March 2017, she competed at the 2017 Russian Championships finishing 7th in the all-around. She won the all-around bronze medal at the Corbeil-Essonnes tournament. On June 2–4, Selezneva competed in her first World Cup event at the 2017 Guadalajara World Cup where she won silver medal in the all-around behind teammate Polina Khonina. She qualified to 3 apparatus finals and won gold in hoop, ribbon and silver in ball. On June 23–26, Selezneva won the all-around gold at the Holon Senior International Tournament. On July 7–9, Selezneva competed at the World Challenge Cup at the 2017 World Cup Berlin where she won bronze in the all-around behind Iuliia Bravikova. She qualified to all the apparatus finals taking 2 gold medals in hoop, ball, silver in clubs and bronze in ribbon. On August 9, during the control training selection process for the 2017 Summer Universiade, Selezneva and Iuliia Bravikova were selected to represent Russia in the rhythmic gymnastics universiade participants. On August 27–29, she won the all-around silver medal at the 2017 Summer Universiade in Taipei, in the apparatus finals: she took gold in ball, silver medals in hoop, ribbon and bronze in clubs.

2018 season
In 2018, Selezneva participated for the first time at the 2018 Grand Prix Moscow, finishing eleventh in the all-around competition. At the 2018 Russian National Championships, Selezneva won the bronze medal in the all-around competition behind Dina Averina and Aleksandra Soldatova. She qualified in three apparatuses finals, and won gold with hoop, ball and clubs. At the 2018 Grand Prix Kiev, she won the gold medal in all-around with a total score of 72.350, ahead of Katrin Taseva and Maria Sergeeva. She qualified to all apparatuses finals and won gold with ball and ribbon and silver with hoop and clubs. At the 2018 Grand Prix Thiais, she won the silver medal in all-around, behind Dina Averina. She qualified in 2 apparatus finals winning bronze with hoop and silver with ribbon. Selezneva participated at the 2018 Sofia World Cup, finishing with a silver medal in the all-around competition, behind teammate Aleksandra Soldatova. At the events finals, she won a silver with ball and a bronze with ribbon; she finished 7th with hoop and 5th with clubs. On April 20–22, at the 2018 Tashkent World Cup, Selezneva won bronze in the all-around, she qualified in all apparatus finals: she won two bronze with ball, ribbon, placed 4th in hoop and 5th in clubs. On April 27–29, Selezneva then competed in a World Challenge Cup event at the 2018 Baku World Cup where she won finished 11th in the all-around after a disastrous clubs and ribbon routine, she qualified in 1 apparatus winning the gold in hoop ahead of teammate Maria Sergeeva. On May 16–17, Selezneva competed at the 2018 Holon Grand Prix and won the all-around bronze medal with a total of 72.050 points, she qualified in 2 apparatus: ball and ribbon, however she took the placement qualification of Soldatova in hoop and clubs after she withdrew from competition in the event finals, Selezneva won silver in ribbon, bronze in clubs and finished 4th in hoop, ball. In 2018 Rhythmic Gymnastics World Championships she was in the reserve team but didn't participate.

2019 season 
In 2019, Selezneva started her International season with the 2019 Grand Prix Moscow, where she finished in 4th place, behind her teammates, Dina Averina, Arina Averina and Aleksandra Soldatova; she took the silver with ball. She won the gold medal with hoop and team, and bronze with ribbon in Baku in the 37th World Championships.

Routine music information 

{| class="wikitable plainrowheaders"
! scope="col" |Year
! scope="col" |Apparatus
! scope="col" |Music title
|-
! rowspan="6" scope="row" |2020
|Hoop
| "Strange Birds", by Birdy
|-
|Ball (second)
| No One Ever Called Me That, by Dario Marianelli|-
|Ball (first)
| "Elegy in E-Flat Minor", by Vladimir Ashkenazy, composed by Sergey Rachmaninoff
|-
|Clubs
| "Bad", "Billie Jean", by Michael Jackson
|-
|Ribbon
| "Bensonhurst Blues", by Oscar Benton
|-
|Ribbon (second)
| I Will Never Forget You, by Alexey Rybnikov
|-
! rowspan="7" scope="row" |2019
|Hoop
| "Meditaton", "Rescue Me" from Atonement by Cirque du Soleil, Dario Marianelli
|-
|Ball
| Chopin, by Elena Vaenga
|-
|Clubs (first)
| "I'm a Dragon", by Apashe & Sway
|-
|Clubs (second)
| "Highway to Hell", by AC/DC
|-
|Clubs (third)
| "Take You Down", by Daniel Pemberton
|-
|Ribbon (first)
| Do You Only Wanna Dance, Sex and the City-Movie Theme by Julio Daviel Big Band, Pfeifer Broz Orchestra
|-
|Ribbon (second)
| Tico-Tico no fubá by Zequinha de Abreu
|-
! rowspan="5" scope="row" |2018
|Hoop
| "Piano Concerto No. 1 in E-Flat Major, S. 124, R. 458", by Philippe Entremont & The Philadelphia Orchestra
|-
|Ball
| "London", by Zemfira
|-
|Clubs
| El Verano, by Novak
|-
|Ribbon
|"Sex Bomb", by Tom Jones
|-
|}

 Competitive highlights(Team competitions in seniors are held only at the World Championships, Europeans and other Continental Games.)''

References

External links 

 
 Ekaterina Selezneva profile 

1995 births
Living people
Russian rhythmic gymnasts
Gymnasts from Moscow
Universiade medalists in gymnastics
Universiade gold medalists for Russia
Universiade silver medalists for Russia
Universiade bronze medalists for Russia
Medalists at the 2017 Summer Universiade
Medalists at the 2019 Summer Universiade